Muhammad Yunus (born 28 June 1940) is a Bangladeshi social entrepreneur, banker, economist and civil society leader who was awarded the Nobel Peace Prize for founding the Grameen Bank and pioneering the concepts of microcredit and microfinance. These loans are given to entrepreneurs too poor to qualify for traditional bank loans. Yunus and the Grameen Bank were jointly awarded the Nobel Peace Prize "for their efforts through microcredit to create economic and social development from below". The Norwegian Nobel Committee said that "lasting peace cannot be achieved unless large population groups find ways in which to break out of poverty" and that "across cultures and civilizations, Yunus and Grameen Bank have shown that even the poorest of the poor can work to bring about their own development". Yunus has received several other national and international honours. He received the United States Presidential Medal of Freedom in 2009 and the Congressional Gold Medal in 2010.

In 2008, he was rated number 2 in Foreign Policy magazine's list of the 'Top 100 Global Thinkers'.

In February 2011, Yunus together with Saskia Bruysten, Sophie Eisenmann and Hans Reitz co-founded Yunus Social Business – Global Initiatives (YSB). YSB creates and empowers social businesses to address and solve social problems around the world. As the international implementation arm for Yunus' vision of a new, humane capitalism, YSB manages incubator funds for social businesses in developing countries and provides advisory services to companies, governments, foundations and NGOs.

In 2012, he became Chancellor of Glasgow Caledonian University in Scotland, a position he held until 2018. Previously, he was a professor of economics at Chittagong University in Bangladesh. He published several books related to his finance work. He is a founding board member of Grameen America and Grameen Foundation, which support microcredit.

Yunus also served on the board of directors of the United Nations Foundation, a public charity to support UN causes from 1998 to 2021.

Early life and education

Early years

The third of nine children, Muhammad Yunus was born on 28 June 1940 to a Bengali Muslim family in the village of Bathua, by the Kaptai road in Hathazari, Chittagong in the Bengal Presidency of the British Raj, present Bangladesh. His father was Hazi Dula Mia Shoudagar, a jeweler, and his mother was Sufia Khatun. His early childhood was spent in the village. In 1944, his family moved to the city of Chittagong, and he moved from his village school to Lamabazar Primary School. By 1949, his mother was afflicted with psychological illness. Later, he passed the matriculation examination from Chittagong Collegiate School ranking 16th of 39,000 students in East Pakistan. During his school years, he was an active Boy Scout, and travelled to West Pakistan and India in 1952, and to Canada in 1955 to attend Jamborees. Later, while Yunus was studying at Chittagong College, he became active in cultural activities and won awards for drama. In 1957, he enrolled in the Department of Economics at Dhaka University and completed his BA in 1960 and MA in 1961
.

After graduation
After his graduation, Yunus joined the Bureau of Economics as a research assistant to the economics researches of Nurul Islam and Rehman Sobhan. Later, he was appointed lecturer in economics in Chittagong College in 1961. During that time, he also set up a profitable packaging factory on the side.  In 1965, he received a Fulbright scholarship to study in the United States. He obtained his PhD in economics from the Vanderbilt University Graduate Program in Economic Development (GPED) in 1971. From 1969 to 1972, Yunus was assistant professor of economics at Middle Tennessee State University in Murfreesboro.

During the Bangladesh Liberation War in 1971, Yunus founded a citizen's committee and ran the Bangladesh Information Center, with other Bangladeshis in the United States, to raise support for liberation. He also published the Bangladesh Newsletter from his home in Nashville. After the War, he returned to Bangladesh and was appointed to the government's Planning Commission headed by Nurul Islam. However, he found the job boring and resigned to join Chittagong University as head of the Economics department.  After observing the famine of 1974, he became involved in poverty reduction and established a rural economic programme as a research project. In 1975, he developed a Nabajug (New Era) Tebhaga Khamar (three share farm) which the government adopted as the Packaged Input Programme. In order to make the project more effective, Yunus and his associates proposed the Gram Sarkar (the village government) programme.
Introduced by president Ziaur Rahman in the late 1970s, the Government formed 40,392 village governments as a fourth layer of government in 2003. On 2 August 2005, in response to a petition by Bangladesh Legal Aids and Services Trust (BLAST), the High Court declared village governments illegal and unconstitutional.

His concept of microcredit for supporting innovators in multiple developing countries also inspired programmes such as the Info lady Social Entrepreneurship Programme.

Early career

In 1976, during visits to the poorest households in the village of Jobra near Chittagong University, Yunus discovered that very small loans could make a disproportionate difference to a poor person. Village women who made bamboo furniture had to take usurious loans to buy bamboo, and repay their profits to the lenders. Traditional banks did not want to make tiny loans at reasonable interest to the poor due to high risk of default. But Yunus believed that, given the chance, the poor will repay the money and hence microcredit was a viable business model.  Yunus lent US$27 of his money to 42 women in the village, who made a profit of BDT 0.50 (US$0.02) each on the loan.  Thus, Yunus is credited with the idea of microcredit.

In December 1976, Yunus finally secured a loan from the government Janata Bank to lend to the poor in Jobra. The institution continued to operate, securing loans from other banks for its projects. By 1982, it had 28,000 members. On 1 October 1983, the pilot project began operation as a full-fledged bank for poor Bangladeshis and was renamed Grameen Bank ("Village Bank").By July 2007, Grameen had issued US$6.38 billion to 7.4 million borrowers. To ensure repayment, the bank uses a system of "solidarity groups". These small informal groups apply together for loans and its members act as co-guarantors of repayment and support one another's efforts at economic self-advancement.

In the late 1980s, Grameen started to diversify by attending to underutilized fishing ponds and irrigation pumps like deep tube wells. In 1989, these diversified interests started growing into separate organisations. The fisheries project became Grameen Motsho ("Grameen Fisheries Foundation") and the irrigation project became Grameen Krishi ("Grameen Agriculture Foundation"). In time, the Grameen initiative grew into a multi-faceted group of profitable and non-profit ventures, including major projects like Grameen Trust and Grameen Fund, which runs equity projects like Grameen Software Limited, Grameen CyberNet Limited, and Grameen Knitwear Limited, as well as Grameen Telecom, which has a stake in Grameenphone (GP), the biggest private phone company in Bangladesh. From its start in March 1997 to 2007, GP's Village Phone (Polli Phone) project had brought cell-phone ownership to 260,000 rural poor in over 50,000 villages.

The success of the Grameen microfinance model inspired similar efforts in about 100 developing countries and even in developed countries including the United States. Many microcredit projects retain Grameen's emphasis of lending to women. More than 94% of Grameen loans have gone to women, who suffer disproportionately from poverty and who are more likely than men to devote their earnings to their families.

For his work with Grameen, Yunus was named an Ashoka: Innovators for the Public Global Academy Member in 2001. In the book Grameen Social Business Model, its author Rashidul Bari said that Grameen's social business model (GSBM) has gone from being theory to an inspiring practice adopted by leading universities (e.g., Glasgow), entrepreneurs (e.g., Franck Riboud) and corporations (e.g., Danone) across the globe. Through Grameen Bank, Rashidul Bari claims that Yunus demonstrated how Grameen Social Business Model can harness the entrepreneurial spirit to empower poor women and alleviate their poverty. One conclusion Bari suggested to draw from Yunus' concepts is that the poor are like a "bonsai tree", and they can do big things if they get access to the social business that holds potential to empower them to become self-sufficient.

Recognition

Yunus was awarded the 2006 Nobel Peace Prize, along with Grameen Bank, for their efforts to create economic and social development. In the prize announcement The Norwegian Nobel Committee mentioned:

Yunus was the first Bangladeshi to ever get a Nobel Prize. After receiving the news of the important award, Yunus announced that he would use part of his share of the $1.4 million (equivalent to $ million in ) award money to create a company to make low-cost, high-nutrition food for the poor; while the rest would go towards establishing the Yunus Science and Technology University in his home district as well as setting up an eye hospital for the poor in Bangladesh.

Former US president Bill Clinton was a vocal advocate for the awarding of the Nobel Prize to Yunus. He expressed this in Rolling Stone magazine as well as in his autobiography My Life. In a speech given at University of California, Berkeley in 2002, President Clinton described Yunus as "a man who long ago should have won the Nobel Prize [in Economics and] I'll keep saying that until they finally give it to him." Conversely, The Economist stated explicitly that while Yunus was doing excellent work to fight poverty, it was not appropriate to award him the Peace Prize, stating: "... the Nobel committee could have made a braver, more difficult, choice by declaring that there would be no recipient at all."

He is one of only seven persons to have won the Nobel Peace Prize, Presidential Medal of Freedom, and the Congressional Gold Medal. Other notable awards include the Ramon Magsaysay Award in 1984, the World Food Prize, the International Simon Bolivar Prize (1996), the Prince of Asturias Award for Concord and the Sydney Peace Prize in 1998,  and the Seoul Peace Prize in 2006. Additionally, Yunus has been awarded 50 honorary doctorate degrees from universities across 20 countries, and 113 international awards from 26 countries including state honours from 10 countries. Bangladesh government brought out a commemorative stamp to honour his Nobel Award.

Yunus was named by Fortune Magazine in March 2012 as one of 12 greatest entrepreneurs of the current era. In its citation, Fortune Magazine said "Yunus' idea inspired countless numbers of young people to devote themselves to social causes all over the world."

In January 2008, Houston, Texas declared 14 January as "Muhammad Yunus Day".

Yunus was named among the most desired thinkers the world should listen to by the FP 100 (world's most influential elite) in the December 2009 issue of Foreign Policy magazine.

In 2010, The British Magazine New Statesman listed Yunus at 40th in the list of "The World's 50 Most Influential Figures 2010".

Yunus received 50 honorary doctorate degrees from universities from Argentina, Australia, Bangladesh, Belgium, Canada, Costa Rica, India, Italy, Japan, Korea, Lebanon, Malaysia, Peru, Russia, South Africa, Spain, Thailand, Turkey, the UK, and the US.
United Nations Secretary General, Ban Ki-Moon, invited Yunus to serve as an MDG Advocate. Yunus sits on the Board of United Nations Foundation, Schwab Foundation, Prince Albert II of Monaco Foundation, Grameen Credit Agricole Microcredit Foundation. He has been a member of Fondation Chirac's honour committee, ever since the foundation was launched in 2008 by former French president Jacques Chirac in order to promote world peace.

Yunus has become a well-known international figure. He has delivered numerous lectures around the world, and has appeared on popular television shows, including The Daily Show with Jon Stewart and The Oprah Winfrey Show in 2006, The Colbert Report in 2008, Real Time with Bill Maher in 2009 and The Simpsons in 2010. On Google+, Yunus is one of the most followed people worldwide, with over two million followers.

Political activity

In early 2006 Yunus, along with other members of the civil society including Rehman Sobhan, Muhammad Habibur Rahman, Kamal Hossain, Matiur Rahman, Mahfuz Anam and Debapriya Bhattacharya, participated in a campaign for honest and clean candidates in national elections. He considered entering politics in the later part of that year. On 11 February 2007, Yunus wrote an open letter, published in the Bangladeshi newspaper Daily Star, where he asked citizens for views on his plan to float a political party to establish political goodwill, proper leadership and good governance. In the letter, he called on everyone to briefly outline how he should go about the task and how they can contribute to it. Yunus finally announced that he is willing to launch a political party tentatively called Citizens' Power (Nagorik Shakti) on 18 February 2007. There was speculation that the army supported a move by Yunus into politics. On 3 May, however, Yunus declared that he had decided to abandon his political plans following a meeting with the head of the interim government, Fakhruddin Ahmed.

In July 2007 in Johannesburg, South Africa, Nelson Mandela, Graça Machel and Desmond Tutu convened a group of world leaders "to contribute their wisdom, independent leadership and integrity to tackle some of the world's toughest problems." Nelson Mandela announced the formation of this new group, The Elders, in a speech he delivered on the occasion of his 89th birthday. Yunus attended the launch of the group and was one of its founding members. He stepped down as an Elder in September 2009, stating that he was unable to do justice to his membership due to the demands of his work.

Yunus is a member of the Africa Progress Panel (APP), a group of ten distinguished individuals who advocate at the highest levels for equitable and sustainable development in Africa. Every year, the Panel releases a report, the Africa Progress Report, that outlines an issue of immediate importance to the continent and suggests a set of associated policies.
In July 2009, Yunus became a member of the SNV Netherlands Development Organisation International Advisory Board to support the organisation's poverty reduction work.
Since 2010, Yunus has served as a Commissioner for the Broadband Commission for Digital Development, a UN initiative which seeks to use broadband internet services to accelerate social and economic development.
In March 2016, he was appointed by United Nations Secretary-General Ban Ki-moon to the High-Level Commission on Health Employment and Economic Growth, which was co-chaired by presidents François Hollande of France and Jacob Zuma of South Africa. Following the Rohingya genocide in 2016–2017, Yunus urged Myanmar to end violence against Rohingya Muslims.

Controversies
The Bangladeshi Government announced a review of Grameen Bank activities on 11 January 2011, which is ongoing. In February, several international leaders, such as Mary Robinson, stepped up their defence of Yunus through a number of efforts, including the founding of a formal network of supporters known as "Friends of Grameen".

On 15 February 2011, the Finance Minister of Bangladesh, Abul Maal Abdul Muhith, declared that Yunus should "stay away" from Grameen Bank while it is being investigated. On 2 March 2011, Muzammel Huq – a former Bank employee, whom the government had appointed chairman in January – announced that Yunus had been fired as managing director of the Bank. However, Bank General Manager Jannat-E Quanine issued a statement that Yunus was "continuing in his office" pending review of the legal issues surrounding the controversy .

In March 2011, Yunus petitioned the Bangladesh High Court challenging the legality of the decision by the Bangladeshi Central Bank to remove him as managing director of Grameen Bank. The same day, nine elected directors of Grameen Bank filed a second petition. U.S. Senator John Kerry expressed his support to Yunus in a statement on 5 March 2011 and declared that he was "deeply concerned" by this affair. The same day in Bangladesh, thousands of people protested and formed human chains to support Yunus.
The High Court hearing on the petitions, was planned for 6 March 2011 but postponed. On 8 March 2011, the Court confirmed Yunus's dismissal.

Accusation of 'loan sharking' and effectiveness of microfinance

The allegations against Muhammad Yunus and Grameen Bank were made in a context where some people began to question the effectiveness of microfinance, prompted by the actions of some for-profit microfinance institutions (MFIs) in India and Mexico. Coercion, peer pressure and physical harassment were reportedly used as loan repayment practices in some specific MFIs. Commercialisation of microcredit prompted Yunus to state that he "never imagined that one day microcredit would give rise to its own breed of loan sharks."

The lure of profits attracted some for-profit MFIs to hold initial public offerings (IPOs), including the largest Indian MFI, SKS Microfinance, which held an IPO in July 2010. In September 2010, Yunus criticised the IPO; in a debate with SKS founder Vikram Akula during the Clinton Global Initiative meeting, he said, "Microcredit is not about exciting people to make money off the poor. That's what you're doing. That's the wrong message completely."
Calculations of actual interest rate vary, but one estimate puts average Grameen rates at about a 23% interest rate (comparable to the inflation rate). At the same time the organisation enjoyed a tax-free status for a period of several years which now has been removed.

Sympathizers of Yunus allege that the government of Bangladesh is exploiting this "moral crisis around microcredit" to oust Yunus.

Political motivations behind the allegations
Though Grameen Bank was quickly cleared by the Norwegian government of all allegations surrounding misused or misappropriated funds in December 2010, in March 2011 the Bangladeshi government launched a three-month investigation of all Grameen Bank's activities. This inquiry prevented Muhammad Yunus from participating in the World Economic Forum.

In January 2011, Yunus appeared in court in a defamation case filed by a local politician from a minor left-leaning party in 2007, complaining about a statement that Yunus made to the AFP news agency, "Politicians in Bangladesh only work for power. There is no ideology here". At the hearing, Yunus was granted bail and exempted from personal appearance at subsequent hearings.

These investigations fueled suspicion that many attacks might be politically motivated, due to difficult relations between Sheikh Hasina and Yunus since early 2007, when Yunus created his own political party, an effort he dropped in May 2007.

Allegations involving partners: the food case and the phone case
On 27 January 2011, Yunus appeared in court in a food-adulteration case filed by the Dhaka City Corporation (DCC) Food Safety Court, accusing him of producing an "adulterated" yogurt whose fat content was below the legal minimum. This yogurt is produced by Grameen Danone, a social business joint venture between Grameen Bank and Danone that aims to provide opportunities for street vendors who sell the yogurt and to improve child nutrition with the nutrient-fortified yogurt. According to Yunus's lawyer, the allegations are "false and baseless". At the request of Yunus's lawyers, pointing procedural irregularities and errors, this case is now considered by the High Court.

Investigation by a 2012 independent public commission examining the Grameen Bank assert that Yunus misrepresented his authority and abused his powers during his tenure in management.  The report establishes that legal challenges exist for authority of the Grameen Bank to have acted as guarantor and to have forwarded credit to independent private enterprises during Yunus's tenure. The report raised specific questions relating to (a) establishment and financing of Grameenphone, a for-profit telecommunications entity initially established as a trust for the Grameen Bank borrowers together with Norwegian majority state-owned multinational Telenor by Yunus, and (b) simultaneous management and operational financing of private enterprises established by Yunus applying resources of the Grameen Bank.  The commission also examined the legal status of the Grameen Bank and concluded that it was de jure public i.e. government entity, of which incompetent oversight by the state and (potentially unwitting) misrepresentation by Yunus in past resulted in the popular perception of the private ownership.  The commission report refers to obstruction of commission investigations by current Grameen Bank management, representatives of Telenor, the Government of Bangladesh, and by partisans of Yunus. Full implications of the report are thus far not closely examined in either state-controlled elements of Bangladeshi media, or by pro-Yunus press releases, where these implicate Yunus as at least accessory to corruption at the nexus of the Bangladeshi public-commercial establishment, in collusion with other parties.

Criticism of ideas

Microfinance has been criticised in the foreign media. The Guardian (UK) asked whether microfinance was a 'neoliberal fairytale'. The article pointed out criticisms including that most loans are not used to create small businesses, but instead 'consumption smoothing'.

Trials
The trial of Muhammad Yunus is the series of trials launched by Prime Minister Sheikh Hasina of Bangladesh against Muhammad Yunus. The former put the latter on trial in 2010 and ultimately removed him from Grameen Bank, citing that he was too old to run the Bank which he founded in 1983. In 2013, he was put on trial for a second time because he had supposedly received earnings without the necessary permission from the government, including his Nobel Peace Prize earnings and the royalties from his book sales. The article claims that this series of trials against Yunus has puzzled billions of people around the world, from the 8.3 million underprivileged women of Grameen Bank to US President Barack Obama. Likening Hasina's political vendetta against Yunus to a modern-day replay of the conflict between Archimedes and General Marcellus, the article predicts that the "banker to the poor" may face a fate similar to the father of mathematics for asking Hasina not to disturb the Grameen Bank. Vikas Bajaj wrote in the Taking Note editorial blog of The New York Times on 7 November 2013:

The government of Bangladesh has played its trump card in its long-running campaign against Grameen Bank and its founder Muhammad Yunus. Last week, legislators passed a law that effectively nationalizes the bank, which pioneered the idea of making small loans to poor women, by wresting control of it from the 8.4 million rural women that own a majority of its shares.

Background
For many years, Yunus remained a follower of Hasina's father, Sheikh Mujib, the founding father of Bangladesh. While teaching at Middle Tennessee State University, Yunus founded the Bangladesh Citizen's Committee (BCC), as a response to West Pakistan's aggression against Bangladesh and its leader Sheikh Mujib. After the outbreak of the war of liberation, the BCC selected Yunus to become editor of its newly published Bangladesh News Letter. Inspired by the birth of Bangladesh in 1971, Yunus returned home in 1972, to help Mujib rebuild the nation shattered by a long and bloody war. The relationship did not end after Mujib's death. Yunus maintained a professional relationship with Mujib's daughter, Hasina. Yunus appointed Hasina—along with US first lady Hillary Clinton—as co-chair of a microcredit summit held 2–4 February 1997. At this event, 50 heads of state and high-level officials from 137 nation-states gathered in Washington, DC, to discuss solutions to poverty. At this macroevent for microcredit, Hasina had nothing but praise for her fatherly figure. In her statement she praised,"the outstanding work done by Professor Yunus and the Grameen Bank he founded.. . . The success of the Grameen Bank has created optimism about the viability of banks engaged in extending micro-credit to the poor. The inaugural ceremony of Grameen Phone, the largest telephone service in Bangladesh, took place at Hasina's office on 26 March 1997. Using Grameen Phone, Hasina made the first call to Thorbjorn Jagland, the then-Norwegian prime minister. When her conversation ended with Jagland, she received another call, this one from Laily Begum, a Grameen telephone employee. However, this long relationship was doomed in 2007 after Yunus disclosed his intention to form a political party, Nagorik Shakti

From friends to foe
The government of Prime Minister Sheikh Hasina waged a destructive campaign against Grameen and its founder, Muhammad Yunus. The New York Times reports, " Her actions appear to be retaliation for Mr. Yunus's announcement in 2007 that he would seek public office, even though he never went through with his plans". According to Times of India, one other factor contributed to her brash decision against Yunus: the Nobel Peace Prize.

Hasina thought that the Norwegian Nobel Peace Prize Committee would give her the prize for signing a peace treaty, the Chittagong Hill Tracts (CHT) in 1997. On 9 March, Attorney General Mahbubey Alam revealed the government's attitude when he said, "Prime Minister Sheikh Hasina should have been awarded the Nobel Peace Prize…" He went on to challenge the wisdom of the Nobel committee for not awarding the prize to his master, Hasina, for the CHT accord.

Historical description
On 11 January 2007, Army General Moeen U Ahmed staged a military coup. Meanwhile, Yunus turned down his request to become the nation's fourth Chief Advisor after Khaleda Zia's term ended. Yunus, however, suggested the general pick Fakhruddin Ahmed for the job. Fakhruddin took office on 11 January 2007 and made it clear on his very first day that he intended not only to arrange a free and fair election but also to clean up corruption. While Khalada and Hasina criticised Fakruddin and claimed that it was not his job to clean up corruption, Yunus expressed his satisfaction. In an interview with the AFP news agency, Yunus remarked that politicians in Bangladesh only work for money, saying, "There is no ideology here." Hasina had a harsh reaction to Yunus' comments, calling him a "usurer who has not only failed to eradicate poverty but has also nurtured poverty." This was Hasina's first public statement against Yunus. One could make an analogy between Yunus' involvement as a nonpolitician and the role that Czech writer Václav Havel played in his country after the overthrow of the Communist regime. Later Yunus announced the name of this prospective political party, Nagorik Shakti (Citizen's Power), saying he had a mission to enter the political arena in his nation in hope of changing its identity from "bottomless basket" to "rising tiger." However, on 3 May, Yunus published a third open letter and put his political ambitions to rest.

Proceedings
Bangladesh government launched the first trial against Yunus in December 2010, one month after the release of Caught in Micro Debt, a documentary by Tom Heinemann. Screened on Norwegian television on 30 November 2010, the film broadcast the allegation that Yunus stashed approximately $100 million in 1996 into Grameen Kalyan, a sister company of Grameen Bank. however, Yunus denied the allegations. After completing a full investigation, the Norwegian government found Yunus innocent. Yunus has also become subject to legal harassment over three criminal cases. A criminal defamation case was filed against Yunus for criticising politicians in 2007. A food inspector filed another case against Yunus, alleging that yogurt manufactured by the Grameen-Danone was adulterated. The final blow came on 3 March 2011. Bangladesh Bank informed Grameen in a letter that Yunus had been removed from Grameen, citing that he was older than the mandatory retirement age of 60, even though nine of the bank's directors-who were elected by 8.3 million Grameen Bank borrowers-allowed him to stay on the job after he had crossed that threshold. Backed by nine boards of directors, 22 thousand employees, and 8.3 million Grameen borrowers, Yunus defied the government order, returned to Grameen's headquarters in Dhaka, and lodged an appeal at Dhaka High Court against the decision. However, Justice Mohammad Momtazuddin Ahmed and Justice Gobinda Chandra Tagore delivered the verdict against Yunus, claiming that Yunus' posting as the MD of Grameen since 1999 was illegal as he had reached the age of 60 by then. However, Yunus still did not lose faith in the justice system. Backed by international leaders (e.g., Hillary and Bill Clinton), national leaders (e.g., Sir Fazle Hasan Abed) and 8.3 million Grameen borrowers, Yunus filed an appeal in Bangladesh Supreme Court against the High Court's verdict. The full bench of the Appellate Division headed by Chief Justice ABM Khairul Haque heard the appeal on 15 March and delivered the verdict which upheld Yunus removal by government.

From 2012
On 2 August 2012, Sheikh Hasina's approved a draft of "Grameen Bank Ordinance 2012" to increase government control over the bank. Currently, that power resides with the bank's directors—consisting of nine poor women—who were elected by 8.3 million Grameen borrowers. Hasina also ordered a fresh investigation into the activities and financial transactions of Yunus in his later years as managing director of Grameen, but people see the move as nothing more than an attempt to destroy his image. The prime minister also alleged that Yunus had received his earnings without the necessary permission from the government, including his Nobel Peace Prize earnings and the royalties from his books.
On 4 October 2013, Bangladesh's cabinet has approved the draft of a new law that will give the country's central bank closer control over Grameen Bank, raising the stakes in a long-running dispute with the pioneering microlender. The Grameen Bank Act 2013 was approved at a cabinet meeting chaired by Prime Minister Sheikh Hasina on Thursday. It was passed by parliament on 7 November 2013, and replaced the Grameen Bank Ordinance, the law that underpinned the creation of Grameen Bank as a specialised microcredit institution in 1983. The government new plan is to break Grameen into 19 pieces. The New York Times reports:

Since then, the government has started an investigation into the bank and is now planning to take over Grameen — a majority of whose shares are owned by its borrowers — and break it up into 19 regional lenders.

Personal life
In 1967, while Yunus attended Vanderbilt University, he met Vera Forostenko, a student of Russian literature at Vanderbilt University and daughter of Russian immigrants to Trenton, New Jersey, United States. They were married in 1970. Yunus's marriage with Vera ended within months of the birth of their baby girl, Monica Yunus, in 1979 in Chittagong, as Vera returned to New Jersey claiming that Bangladesh was not a good place to raise a baby. Monica became an operatic soprano based in New York City. Yunus later married Afrozi Yunus, who was then a researcher in physics at Manchester University. She was later appointed as a professor of physics at Jahangirnagar University. Their daughter Deena Afroz Yunus was born in 1986.

Yunus's brother Muhammad Ibrahim is a former professor of physics at the University of Dhaka and the founder of The Center for Mass Education in Science (CMES), which brings science education to adolescent girls in villages. His other brother Muhammad Jahangir (d. 2019) was a television presenter and a social activist in Bangladesh.

Yunus Centre
The Yunus Centre in Dhaka, Bangladesh, is a think tank for issues related to social business, working in the field of poverty alleviation and sustainability. It is 'aimed primarily at promoting and disseminating Professor Yunus' philosophy, with a special focus on social business' and currently chaired by Prof. Muhammad Yunus.

Publications
 
 
 
 
 
 
 
 Yunus, Muhammad, Moingeon, Bertrand and Laurence Lehmann-Ortega (2010), "Building Social Business Models: Lessons from the Grameen Experience", April–June, vol 43, number 2–3, Long Range Planning, pp. 308–325

Documentaries
 2000 - "16 Decisions"
 2010 - To Catch a Dollar
 2011 - Bonsai People – The Vision of Muhammad Yunus

Legacy and honours

 In 1998, Yunus was awarded Indira Gandhi Peace Prize as the founder of Grameen Bank
 In 2006, awarded Nobel Peace Prize for his finance work.
 Chosen by Wharton School of Business in Philadelphia as one of The 25 Most Influential Business Persons of the Past 25 Years, covered in a PBS documentary.
 In 2006, Time magazine ranked him as one of the top 12 business leaders, including him among "60 years of Asian Heroes."
 In 2008, Yunus was voted second on the list of Top 100 Public Intellectuals in an open online poll conducted by Prospect Magazine (UK) and Foreign Policy (United States).
 In 2009, Yunus was awarded the Golden Biatec Award, the highest award bestowed by Slovakia's Informal Economic Forum Economic Club, for individuals who exhibit economic, social, scientific, educational and cultural accomplishments in the Slovak Republic.
In 2021, Yunus was awarded the Olympic Laurel, for his extensive work in sports for development.
 In 2021, Yunus was awarded United Nations Foundation's Champion of Global Change Award. He was given the award in recognition of his enlightened leadership and innovation to enhance human dignity, equity, and justice.

See also

 Fazle Hasan Abed
 Islamic banking
 Yunus Social Business - Global Initiatives

References

Further reading

External links
 
 Muhammad Yunus biography at Grameen Bank
  with the Nobel lecture 10 December 2006
 Profile and Papers at Research Papers in Economics/RePEc
 Exclusive Interview with Educational Technology Magazine
 
 
 
 
 
 
 
 
 

1940 births
Living people
Bangladeshi economists
Bangladeshi businesspeople
Bengali Muslims
Development specialists
People in international development
Microfinance people
Nobel Peace Prize laureates
Bangladeshi Nobel laureates
University of Dhaka alumni
Vanderbilt University alumni
Middle Tennessee State University faculty
Presidential Medal of Freedom recipients
Ashoka Bangladesh Fellows
Ramon Magsaysay Award winners
People from Hathazari Upazila
HuffPost writers and columnists
Recipients of the Independence Day Award
People associated with Glasgow Caledonian University
Bangladeshi bankers
Social entrepreneurs
Pfeffer Peace Prize laureates
Academic staff of the University of Chittagong
Advisors of Caretaker Government of Bangladesh
Chittagong College alumni
Recipients of the Four Freedoms Award
United Nations Foundation
Winners of the Nikkei Asia Prize
Agriculture and food award winners
International Simón Bolívar Prize recipients
Honorary citizens of Paris
Chittagong Collegiate School and College alumni
Fulbright alumni